Dimitrije Dimitrijević (died 1984) was a Bosnian-Herzegovinian football player who played between two world wars. He was one of the founders of FK Željezničar and a scorer of the first goal ever by this football club.

Just like all the other founders of FK Željezničar, he worked as a railway worker in Sarajevo. It was his idea to form a football club as a way of recreation in 1921. This idea was accepted with joy by his colleagues at work. FK Željezničar played its first game on September 17, 1921. against SAŠK Sarajevo. Despite losing by 5-1, that game meant the beginning of the club which was later to become widely popular. Dimitrije Dimitrijević scored the only FK Željezničar goal of the game.

Personal life
He was a driver of a steam train from Sarajevo to Višegrad. He had 5 brothers. His mother and father were originally Greek. He was born in Koševo street.  His mother came from a family called Makridis from Athens, and his father changed his name upon emigration yet is believed that the family name was Voskos and they originate from the Black Sea. His only descendant is Dunja, his daughter, who is currently a professor at the music academy in Sarajevo.

Death
He died in September 1984. and was buried at Bare city cemetery.

References

Year of birth missing
Place of birth missing
1984 deaths
Association footballers not categorized by position
Yugoslav footballers
FK Željezničar Sarajevo players